This is a partial list of notable homeschooling curricula and programmes that are popularly used in the homeschooling community.

Accredited institutions

Independent 
 American School of Correspondence
 Calvert School
 Connections Academy
 Stride, Inc.
 Time4Learning
 Laurel Springs School
Oak Meadow
 Wolsey Hall, Oxford
 AanganChaura

Religious

Christian 
 Griggs International Academy, formerly Home Study International

Separate institutions

Religious

Christian 
 Advanced Training Institute (ATI) International

Curricula and methodologies

Religious

Christian 
 A Beka Book
 Accelerated Christian Education (ACE)
 Bob Jones University (BJU) Press Academy of Home Education

References 

home